The Brearley House is a historic Georgian house built in 1761 in Lawrenceville, New Jersey.  It was added to the National Register of Historic Places in 1979.  

Lawrence Township, which owns the property, leased it to the Lawrence Historical Society in 2000.

See also
National Register of Historic Places listings in Mercer County, New Jersey

References

External links
Lawrence Historical Society

National Register of Historic Places in Mercer County, New Jersey
Houses in Mercer County, New Jersey
Lawrence Township, Mercer County, New Jersey
Museums in Mercer County, New Jersey
Historic house museums in New Jersey
New Jersey Register of Historic Places